SortlandsAvisa (The Sortland Gazette) is a local Norwegian newspaper published in the municipality of Sortland in Nordland county.

SortlandsAvisa is a politically independent newspaper. It is published every Thursday, and is edited by Geir Bjørn Nilsen. The newspaper was launched on January 10, 2008. The founder of SortlandsAvisa and its first editor was Gard Lehne Borch Michalsen, who now heads the media site Medier24. The newspaper is printed by HTG Trykk AS in Harstad.

Editors
 January 2008 – September 2013: Gard Borch Michalsen
 September 2013 – December 2013: Erik Jenssen (acting editor)
 January 2013 – July 2016: Thor Anders Angelsen
 July 2016 – December 2016: Sanna Drogset Børstad (acting editor)
 January 2017 – : Geir Bjørn Nilsen

Circulation
According to the Norwegian Audit Bureau of Circulations and National Association of Local Newspapers, SortlandsAvisa has had the following annual circulation:
2008: 1,189
2009: 1,569
2010: 1,598
2011: 1,581
2012: 1,555 
2013: 1,534
2014: 1,436
2015: 1,275
2016: 1,178

References

External links
SortlandsAvisa homepage

Newspapers published in Norway
Norwegian-language newspapers
Sortland
Mass media in Nordland
Publications established in 2008
2008 establishments in Norway